Nikolay Davydenko was the defending champion, but lost to Roger Federer 6–3, 6–4 in the final. Federer did not lose a single set in the entire tournament.

Seeds

Qualifying

Draw

Finals

Top half

Bottom half

References

Main Draw

2011 Qatar Open